Sawuara (also, Sa-Ron-ra, Sa-vour-ras, Sa-vow-ra, Sa-wa-rahs, and Shah-woo-rum) is a former Karok settlement in Del Norte County, California, located on the east bank of the Klamath River not far below Orleans (then Orleans Bar). Its precise location is unknown.

References

Karuk villages
Former settlements in Del Norte County, California
Former Native American populated places in California
Lost Native American populated places in the United States